Jo Wilkinson may refer to:

Jo Wilkinson (athlete) in 2010 European Athletics Championships – Women's Marathon
Jo Wilkinson (musician) who worked with Eligh and others

See also
Joe Wilkinson (disambiguation)